CIAM may refer to:
 Congrès Internationaux d'Architecture Moderne, the International Congresses of Modern Architecture
 Commission Internationale Aeromodelling, a section of Fédération Aéronautique Internationale
 Central Institute of Aviation Motors, a specialized Russian research and engineering facility
 CIAM-FM, is a radio station in Fort Vermilion, Alberta, Canada
 CIAM, former call sign of CJDV-FM, a radio station in Cambridge, Ontario, Canada
 CIAM, Customer Identity Access Management